Thomas Ballantyne (1829–1908) was a Canadian politician.

Thomas Ballantyne may also refer to:
Thomas Ballantyne (journalist) (1806–1871), Scottish journalist

See also
Thomas Ballantyne Martin (1901–1995), British politician, stockbroker and journalist
Thomas A. Ballantine Jr. (1926–1992), U.S. federal judge